Hernán is a Spanish masculine given name, originating from Germanic Hernan in the Visigoth culture in Spain. It is the Latinized version of the compound name Fard-nanth, which seems to mean "gentle traveler" or "spiritual traveler". The House of Hernán gave its name to those with the surname Hernández, the -ez at the end denoting membership of that House. The surname, like many Spanish surnames, is of Teutonic-Gothic origin. It is not connected with "Herman" - also of Germanic origin, but a different one.

Persons with the given name include:
 Hernán Alvarado Solano (1946–2011), Colombian Roman Catholic bishop
 Hernán Andrade (born 1960), Mexican racewalker
 Hernán Barcos (born 1984), Argentinian football player
 Hernán Barreneche (born 1939), retired long-distance runner
 Hernán Behn (19th century), Puerto Rican businessperson
 Hernán Bernardello (born 1986), Argentine football midfielder
 Hernán Boyero (born 1979), Argentine football striker
 Hernán Büchi (born 1949), Chilean economist and politician
 Hernán Buenahora (born 1967), Colombian road racing cyclist
 Hernán Caputto (born 1974), Argentine footballer
 Hernán Carrasco Vivanco (21st century), former Chilean football (soccer) manager
 Hernán Cattáneo (21st century), Argentinian house DJ
 Hernán Cortés (1485–1547), Spanish conquistador
 Hernán Crespo (born 1975), Argentine international footballer
 Hernán Cristante (born 1969), Argentine goalkeeper
 Hernán Santa Cruz (1906-1999), Chilean delegate to the United Nations
 Hernán Darío Gómez (born 1956), Colombian ex-football player and manager
 Hernán Díaz (born 1965), former Argentine football right back
 Hernán Elizondo Arce (born 1920), Costa Rican novelist and poet
 Hernán Figueroa (born 1927), Chilean decathlete
 Hernán Fredes (born 1987), Argentine football midfielder
 Hernán Gamboa (born 1946), Venezuelan musician
 Hernán Gaviria (1969–2002), Colombian football midfielder
 Hernán Giraldo (21st century), Colombian murderer
 Adrián Hernán González (born 1976), Argentine football midfielder
 Hernán Gumy (born 1972), former tennis player
 Hernán Iribarren (born 1984), Major League Baseball utility player
 Hernán Larraín (born 1947), conservative Chilean lawyer, university lecturer, and politician
 Hernán Losada (born 1982), Argentine football midfielder
 Hernán Maisterra (born 1972), retired Argentine footballer
 Hernán Mattiuzzo (born 1984), Argentine football midfielder
 Hernán Medford (born 1968), Costa Rican soccer player and coach
 Hernán Medina Calderón (born 1937), Colombian road racing cyclist
 Jorge Hernán Monge (1938–2019), former Costa Rican soccer player
 Elfego Hernán Monzón Aguirre (1912–1981), President of Guatemala
 Hernán Darío Muñoz (born 1973), Colombian road racing cyclist
 Hernán Neira (born 1960), Chilean writer
 Hernán Nuñez (1475–1553), Spanish humanist, classicist, philologist, and paremiographer
 Facundo Hernán Quiroga (born 1978), Argentine football defender
 Hernán Orjuela (born 1958), Colombian host
 Hernán Padilla (born 1938), retired physician
 Hernán Paolo Dellafiore (born 1985), Argentine-Italian football central defender
 Hernán Patiño (1966–1995), Colombian road cyclist
 Hernán Peirone (born 1986), Argentine football striker
 Hernán Pellerano (born 1984), Argentine football defender
 Hernán Pérez de Ovando (13th century), Spanish nobleman
 Hernán Piquín (born 1973), Argentine dancer and actor
 Hernán Ramírez Necochea (1917–1979), Chilean historian
 Hernán Rengifo (born 1983), Peruvian football player
 Hernán Rivera Letelier (born 1950), Chilean novelist
 Hernán Rodrigo López (born 1978), Uruguayan football player
 Hernán Sandoval (born 1983), Guatemalan football striker
 Hernán Senillosa (born 1977), Argentine rugby union player
 Hernán Siles Zuazo (1914–1996), politician from Bolivia
 Hernán Silva (born 1948), retired Chilean football referee
 Hernán Toro (born circa 1950), Venezuelan cinematographer
 Hernán Trizano (1860–1926), Chilean-Italian military and police

In USA without the accent
 Hernan Bas (born 1978), American painter
 Hernan Diaz (21st century) Argentinian-American writer

See also
Ferdinand
Hurricane Hernan (disambiguation)

Masculine given names
Spanish masculine given names